Leslie Roger Landrum is an American botanist serving as senior research scientist at Arizona State University School of Life Sciences, and curator of the ASU Vascular Plant Herbarium.  He attained M.S. and Ph.D. degrees from the University of Michigan, and has been at Arizona State University since 1986.

From 1969 to 1973, he worked with the Peace Corps at the Forestry School of the University of Chile, where he gained an interest in the flora of South America, particularly the myrtle family (Myrtaceae).  Since then, he has published descriptions of new genera and species within the South American Myrtaceae, devoting particular study to the genus Psidium (which includes the commercially important guava).

Other concentrations include the Chilean species of the widespread genus Berberis, the usage of computer models in evaluating methods of phylogenetic analysis, and serving on a committee of botanists (including D.J. Pinkava) working on a new manual of the vascular plants of Arizona to replace the aging Arizona Flora by Kearney and Peebles (last updated in 1960).

He is on the editorial board of the Journal of The Arizona–Nevada Academy of Science, and since 2005, he has been the editor of Canotia: A New Journal of Arizona Botany.

Landum is one of the original scientists to participate in the Ask A Biologist program and the subject of the "Smashing Success" article detailing his work with ASU Vascular Plant Herbarium.

References

 Ed. Landrum, LR. Canotia: A New Journal of Arizona Botany.  2005–present.
 Landrum, LR. (1990). Accara: a new genus of Myrtaceae, Myrtinae from Brazil. Systematic Botany 15(2):221–225.
 Landrum, LR. (1991). Chamguava: a new genus of Myrtaceae (Myrtinae) from Mesoamerica. Systematic Botany 16(1):21–29.
 Landrum, LR. (1998). A new species of Calycolpus (Myrtaceae) from the Campos Rupestres, Minas Gerais, Brazil. Novon 8:244–246.
 Landrum, LR. (2002). Two new species of Campomanesia (Myrtaceae) from Espirito Santo and Bahia, Brazil. Brittonia 53(4):534–538.
 Naufel, Stephanie.  "It's his birthday, he'll evolve if he wants to." ASU Web Devil, February 12, 2007.  Accessed from https://web.archive.org/web/20070928070729/http://www.asuwebdevil.com/issues/2007/02/12/news/699712, February 25, 2007.
 Smith, Judith.  "Guava, guava, everywhere ..." ASU Insight, June 30, 2006.  Accessed from http://www.asu.edu/news/stories/200607/20060703_guava.htm, February 25, 2007.

External links
 
 

Botanists with author abbreviations
21st-century American botanists
Living people
Arizona State University faculty
University of Michigan alumni
Year of birth missing (living people)